Caspase 16, pseudogene is a protein that in humans is encoded by the CASP16P gene, but not translated.

References

Further reading 

Pseudogenes